Hildur Krog (22 March 1922 – 25 August 2014) was a Norwegian botanist.

She was born in Modum. She took the dr.philos. degree in 1968 with a thesis on Alaskan lichens, was hired as a curator at the Botanical Museum of Oslo in 1971 and served as professor at the University of Oslo from 1987 to 1992. For 15 year from 1969 she collaborated with the British amateur lichenologist Dougal Swinscow to study the  macrolichen flora of East Africa. They undertook field collections as well as characterisation and revision of the limited existing lichen knowledge of the region, presented in 33 scientific publications and a book The Macrolichens of East Africa, British Museum (Natural History) in 1988.

In 1992 Hildur Krog was awarded the Acharius Medal by the International Association for Lichenology

She was a fellow of the Norwegian Academy of Science and Letters. She died in 2014.

Several lichen are named in her honour, including Krogia which a genus of corticolous lichens in the family Ramalinaceae.
Also lichen species such as; Leptogium krogiae, Dictyonema krogiae, and Usnea krogiana.

See also
 :Category:Taxa named by Hildur Krog

References

1922 births
2014 deaths
People from Modum
20th-century Norwegian botanists
Academic staff of the University of Oslo
Members of the Norwegian Academy of Science and Letters
Acharius Medal recipients
Norwegian lichenologists
Women lichenologists
Fulbright alumni